Naoko Kijimuta and Nana Miyagi were the defending champions but did not compete that year.

Elena Likhovtseva and Ai Sugiyama won in the final 1–6, 6–3, 6–4 against Sung-Hee Park and Shi-Ting Wang.

Seeds
Champion seeds are indicated in bold text while text in italics indicates the round in which those seeds were eliminated.

n/a
 Elena Likhovtseva /  Ai Sugiyama (champions)
 Kerry-Anne Guse /  Rachel McQuillan (first round)
 Eva Melicharová /  Helena Vildová (first round)

Draw

External links
 1998 Thalgo Australian Women's Hardcourts Doubles draw

Doubles